There are at least 6 named lakes and reservoirs in Baxter County, Arkansas.

Lakes
According to the United States Geological Survey, there are no named lakes in Baxter County.

Reservoirs
Big Flat Lake, el.  
Bull Shoals Lake, el.  
Gardner Lake, el.  
Higginbottom Lake, el.  
Norfork Lake, el.  
Ozark Acres Lake, el.

See also
 List of lakes in Arkansas

Notes

Bodies of water of Baxter County, Arkansas
Baxter